Väring is a locality situated in Skövde Municipality, Västra Götaland County, Sweden with 571 inhabitants in 2010.

References

See also 
 Waering (surname)

Populated places in Västra Götaland County
Populated places in Skövde Municipality